is a Japanese writer of literary fiction.  She has published several novels and short stories, and has been awarded three major Japanese literary prizes.

Fujino is a transgender woman who reflects the difficulties of her own life journey in the characterisations of her writing.  Many of her characters are social misfits in conflict with the conventions and mores of wider Japanese society.

Born in the city of Fukuoka, Fujino attended Chiba University. In the 1980s, she worked in a major Japanese publishing house before beginning her own writing career.

Selected works 
 Gogo no jikanwari (Afternoon timetable), 1995 (Winner, 14th Kaien New Novelists Prize)
 Shonen to shojo no poruka [Boy's and Girl's Polka] Benesse Corporation, 1996; Kodansha, 2000 (paperback)
 Oshaberi kaidan [Chatty] Kodansha, 1998; paperback 2001 (Winner, 20th Noma New Writers Prize)
 Natsu no yakusoku [Summer promise] Kodansha, 2000 (Winner, 122nd Akutagawa Prize)
 Ruuto 225 [Route 225] Rironsha, 2002; Shinchosha, 2004 (paperback)
 "The Housewife and the Police Box" (English translation of "Shufu to koban"), included in Tokyo Fragments: Short Stories of Tokyo by Five of Japan's leading Contemporary Writers (translated by Giles Murray), IBC Publishing, 2004
 Bejitaburu haitsu [Vegetable apartment] Kobunsha, 2005
 "Her Room" (English translation of "Kanojo no heya"), included in Inside and Other Short Fiction - Japanese Women by Japanese Women Kodansha, 2006

Print 
 "Preface" in Tokyo Fragments: Short Stories of Tokyo by Five of Japan's leading Contemporary Writers (translated by Giles Murray), IBC Publishing, 2004

References

Online 
 J'Lit | Authors : Chiya Fujino* | Books from Japan 
 Japanese Fiction Project: Emerging Writers in Translation - English translation of Oshaberi kaidan [Chatty] and biographical note
 News report concerning political controversy over Fujino's 2000 Akutagawa Prize

1962 births
Living people
20th-century Japanese novelists
21st-century Japanese novelists
Japanese LGBT novelists
Transgender novelists
Transgender women
Writers from Fukuoka Prefecture
Akutagawa Prize winners
Japanese women short story writers
Japanese women novelists
Chiba University alumni
21st-century Japanese women writers
20th-century Japanese women writers
20th-century Japanese short story writers
21st-century Japanese short story writers